Pande Mikoma is an administrative ward in Kilwa District of Lindi Region in Tanzania. 
According to the 2012 census, the ward has a total population of 8,094. The ward is home to the island of Songo Mnara Island which is home to the ruins of Songo Mnara, a World Heritage Site. The ward seat is Pande village.

References

Wards of Kilwa District
Wards of Lindi Region